The following is an overview of the events of 1896 in film, including a list of films released and notable births.



Events

 January – In the United States, the Vitascope film projector is designed by Charles Francis Jenkins and Thomas Armat. Armat begins working with Thomas Edison to manufacture it.
 January 14 – Birt Acres demonstrates his film projector, the Kineopticon, the first in Britain, to the Royal Photographic Society at the Queen's Hall in London. This is the first film show to an audience in the U.K.
 February 20 – In London:
 Robert W. Paul demonstrates his film projector, the Theatrograph (later known as the Animatograph), at the Alhambra Theatre.
 The Lumière Brothers first project their films in Britain, at the Empire Theatre of Varieties, Leicester Square.
 April – Edison and Armat's Vitascope is used to project motion pictures in public screenings in New York City.
 May 14 – Tsar Nicholas II of Russia is crowned in Moscow, the first coronation ever recorded in film.
 July 11 – First films screened in Venezuela by Luis Manuel Méndez and Manuel Trujillo Durán at the Baralt Theatre in Maracaibo.
 July 26 – "Vitascope Hall" opens on Canal Street, New Orleans, the first business devoted exclusively to showing motion pictures at a fixed location 
 September 28 – The Pathé Frères film company is founded.
 October 19 – "Edisonia Hall" in Buffalo, New York, the first building constructed specifically for showing motion pictures. 
 November 3 - Marius Sestier films the Melbourne Cup, a major sporting event in Australia.
 In France, magician and filmmaker Georges Méliès begins experimenting with the new motion picture technology, developing early special effect techniques, including stop motion. Films that year included The Devil's Castle, A Nightmare, A Terrible Night.
 William Selig founds the Selig Polyscope Company in Chicago.
 Demeny-Gaumont work on a 60 mm format, first known as Biographe (unperforated), then Chronophotographe (perforated).
 Casimir Sivan and E. Dalphin create a 38 mm format.

Notable films released in 1896

Alexandre Promio
Lion, London Zoological Gardens
Pelicans, London Zoological Gardens

Alice Guy-Blaché
The Cabbage Fairy 
Le chapeau de Tabarin 
Le clubmen
Les concierges
Les démolisseurs
Chez le barbier

Birt Acres
The Boxing Kangaroo
Boxing Match; or, Glove Contest
Dancing Girls
Landing at Low Tide
Rough Sea at Dover directed with Robert W. Paul
Yarmouth Fishing Boats Leaving Harbour

Gabriel Veyre
Carga de rurales, a Mexican short black-and-white silent documentary film.
Un duelo a pistola en el bosque de Chapultepec (Duel au pistolet).

Georges Méliès

Arrival of a Train at Vincennes Station, currently presumed to be a lost film
A Lightning Sketch, a series of four French short silent films (lost)
A Nightmare, it was advertised as a scène fantastique.
A Serpentine Dance, it was released by Méliès's company Star Film and is numbered 44 in its catalogues (lost)
A Terrible Night, it is listed with the descriptive subtitle scène comique.
Conjurer Making Ten Hats in Sixty Seconds (lost)
Conjuring, the film was rediscovered in 2014
Miss de Vère (English Jig)
The Haunted Castle (aka The House of the Devil, aka The Devil's Castle)
The Rag-Picker
The Rescue on the River
The Vanishing Lady
Playing Cards
Post No Bills
Watering the Flowers, most likely a lost film

Louis Lumière

Arab Cortege, Geneva
Arrival Of A Train At La Ciotat
Bataille de boules de neige
Carmaux, Drawing Out The Coke
Childish Quarrel
Children Digging For Clams
Démolition d'un mur
Dragoons Crossing The Saone
Loading A Boiler
New York: Broadway At Union Square
New York: Brooklyn Bridge
Poultry-Yard
Pompiers a Lyon
Promenade Of Ostriches, Paris Botanical Gardens
Serpentine Dance

M.H. Laddé
 Gestoorde hengelaar (lost)
 Spelende kinderen (lost)
 Zwemplaats voor Jongelingen te Amsterdam (lost)

Robert W. Paul
Barnet Horse Fair
Blackfriars Bridge
Comic Costume Race
Rough Sea at Dover directed with Birt Acres
The Twins' Tea Party
Two A.M.; or, the Husband's Return produced by Robert W. Paul

William Heise

Feeding The Doves
The Kiss, starring May Irwin and John Rice. First kiss on film. May be considered the first romantic film.

William K.L. Dickson
Dancing Darkies, an American, short, black-and-white, silent documentary film.
 A watermelon feast, directed by William Kennedy Dickson.

Others
Le Coucher de la Mariée, a French erotic short film considered to be one of the first erotic films (or "stag party films") made. The film was produced by Eugène Pirou and directed by Albert Kirchner under the pseudonym "Léar".
Macintyre's X-Ray Film, a documentary radiography film directed by Scottish medical doctor John Macintyre.
McKinley at Home, Canton, Ohio, is a silent film reenactment of William McKinley receiving the Republican nomination for President of the United States in September 1896 produced by the American Mutoscope and Biograph Company.
A Morning Alarm, produced by Edison Studios.
A Sea Cave Near Lisbon, a British short silent actuality film, directed by Henry Short.
 Up the River, directed by Unknown.

Births

Debut
Alice Guy as a director in Les démolisseurs
May Irwin as an actress in The Kiss (1 April)
John C. Rice as an actor in The Kiss (1 April)
Cissy Fitzgerald as an actress in 50 feet of actuality film of Fitzgerald by Edison; presumably elements from the 1894 play The Gaiety Girl
Robert B. Mantell as an actor in Select Scenes from 'Monbars'

External links

References

 
Film by year